Jubair Hossain (born 12 September 1995) is a Bangladeshi cricketer. He made his Test match debut for Bangladesh against Zimbabwe on 25 October 2014. He made his One Day International (ODI) debut on the same tour in the fourth ODI match on 28 November 2014. He made his Twenty20 International debut for Bangladesh against Zimbabwe on 13 November 2015.

References

External links
 

1995 births
Living people
Bangladeshi cricketers
Bangladesh Test cricketers
Bangladesh One Day International cricketers
Bangladesh Twenty20 International cricketers
Dhaka Division cricketers
Abahani Limited cricketers
Chittagong Division cricketers
Bangladesh East Zone cricketers
Bangladesh A cricketers
People from Jamalpur District